Cristela was an American multi-camera sitcom television series that aired from October 10, 2014, through March 6, 2015, on ABC. The series was created by stand-up comedian Cristela Alonzo, who also starred in and wrote for the series and served as an executive producer with co-creator Kevin Hench, Becky Clements, Marty Adelstein, and Shawn Levy for 20th Century Fox Television. This made her the first Latina to create, produce, write, and star in her own primetime comedy.
The series was canceled by ABC on May 7, 2015.

Synopsis
The series chronicles the life of Cristela Hernandez, a Mexican-American law school graduate living in Dallas, Texas, who must balance her chance to live the American Dream by working as an unpaid intern at a law firm with the concerns of her family, including her sister Daniela (who thinks she should get a paying job), her brother-in-law Felix (who thinks of her as a freeloader), and her mother Natalia (who wants her to settle down and marry). At work, she deals with her boss Trent Culpepper (who is prone to unintentional racist statements), his daughter Maddie (who could not care less about working, and is described by Cristela as a 'rich spoiled white girl'), and Josh (who is her love interest for the series).

Cast

Main cast
 Cristela Alonzo as Cristela Hernandez, a sassy and sarcastic aspiring attorney who lives with her sister and brother-in-law
 Maria Canals-Barrera as Daniela Gonzalez (née Hernandez), Cristela's over-the-top, vain sister who is the manager of a call center
 Carlos Ponce as Felix Gonzalez, Cristela's brother-in-law, married to Daniela, Cristela's sister
 Terri Hoyos as Natalia Hernandez, Cristela's and Daniela's critical, old-fashioned mother who constantly refers to growing up in poverty in a Mexican village
 Andrew Leeds as Josh, Cristela's competitive co-worker from a privileged background, and her possible love interest
 Sam McMurray as Trent Culpepper, Cristela's greedy boss who frequently makes racist comments
 Justine Lupe as Maddie Culpepper, Trent's materialistic daughter and Cristela's ditzy co-worker
 Isabella Day as Isabella Gonzalez, Felix and Daniela's daughter
 Jacob Guenther as Henry Gonzalez, Felix and Daniela's son

Recurring cast
 Gabriel Iglesias as Alberto, Felix's annoying cousin and co-worker who is in love with Cristela (much to her dismay)
 Adam Shapiro as Ben Buckner, an associate who works with Cristela and later becomes interested in her romantically

Characters mentioned but not seen
 Juanita Canales, the family's neighbor; Natalia and Juanita are always trying to one-up each other, and Natalia openly expresses hatred for Juanita to the family.
 Mr. Hernandez, Cristela, Daniela, and Eddie's father, and Natalia's estranged husband, who left the family immediately after Cristela was born

Guest stars
 Mark Cuban as himself
 Valente Rodriguez as Eduardo "Eddie" Hernandez, Cristela and Daniela's brother who works in Oklahoma. He is Natalia's favorite child, due to him being her only son.
 Roseanne Barr as Veronica Culpepper (née Price), Trent's estranged third wife who is also a lawyer. She openly dislikes her husband, but becomes a friend of Cristela.
 Tim Allen as Mike Baxter, from Last Man Standing
 Héctor Elizondo as Ed Alzate, from Last Man Standing

Production
In 2013, Alonzo created her own semi-autobiographical comedy pilot Cristela for ABC. It was not greenlit as a part of the 2013–14 television season, but on February 26, 2014, ABC ordered another pilot presentation, and filmed a full-length pilot on the stage of Last Man Standing, where it got a strong testing from the audience. On May 10, 2014, ABC picked up the pilot to series for the 2014–15 television season.

On November 24, 2014, Cristela was picked up for a full season.

Crossover with Last Man Standing
On February 9, 2015, ABC announced that Cristela would cross over with fellow ABC Friday night sitcom Last Man Standing, with that show's star Tim Allen appearing in the episode "Last Goose Standing".

Cancellation
The series was canceled by ABC on May 7, 2015. ABC cited the show's live ratings as the reason for its cancellation.

Episodes

Reception

Critical response
The series started with mixed reviews from critics despite praise for Alonzo's performance. On Rotten Tomatoes, Cristela has a rating of 52%, based on 31 reviews, with the site's critical consensus reading, "Though Cristela Alonzo has a pleasing energy, Cristela'''s disappointing supporting cast and uneven writing ruin the show's attempts at humor." Metacritic gave the show a score of 61 out of 100, based on 18 critics, indicating "generally favorable review".

However, as the season progressed, Cristela began earning more positive reviews.

Ratings

Although the series initially premiered to decent ratings, ratings gradually declined throughout the season, resulting in its cancellation.

Season overview

By episode

Broadcast
In Australia, Cristela premiered on Fox8 on February 1, 2015.

In Italy, Cristela'' premiered on Fox Comedy September 5, 2015.

References

External links
 
 

2010s American sitcoms
2014 American television series debuts
2015 American television series endings
American Broadcasting Company original programming
2010s American legal television series
English-language television shows
Television series by 20th Century Fox Television
Television shows set in Dallas
Latino sitcoms